This is the discography of American hip hop duo UGK from Port Arthur, Texas.

Albums

Studio albums

Compilation albums
Lost Tracks (2002)
Side Hustles (2002) #70 Billboard 200; #10 R&B/ Hip Hop
Best of UGK (2003)
UGK Chopped and Screwed (2004)
The Essential UGK (2014)

Mixtapes
The Bigtyme Way (2014)

Extended plays

Singles

As lead artist

As featured artist

Guest appearances

References

External links
UGK discography at Discogs

Discographies of American artists
Hip hop discographies